Steven Pirie is an English writer of horror, fantasy and humour based in Liverpool.

Bibliography

Novels

 Digging up Donald (Immanion Press, 2004)
 Burying Brian (Immanion Press, 2010)

Short stories
 Rogers' Cold Fusion (Planet Relish Magazine, 2003)
 What Goes Up (The Phone Book, 2003)
 A Foot in Alpha Centauri's Door (Planet Relish Magazine, 2003)
 Roger's Shoe, or Hat, or Dog (The Dark Krypt, 2003)
 An Old Problem (The Phone Book, 2003)
 Susan's Eyes (Flash Me Magazine, 2003)
 The Kiss (Flashquake Magazine, 2003)
 Colquitt's High-energy Trousers (Andromeda Spaceways Inflight Magazine, 2003)
 Spartacus (Alien Skin Magazine, 2003)
 Bob, and Clair, and the Meaning of Life (Whispers of Wickedness magazine, 2004)
 A Small Box of Rat Poison (Whispers of Wickedness online, 2004)
 Titan's Teashop (Whispers of Wickedness online, 2004)
 And God Saw That It Was... (Whispers of Wickedness online, 2004)
 The Soup in Uncle Norman's Beard (Tryst, 2005)
 The Black Arts of Mrs Beelzebub From Number Six (The Mammoth Book of New Comic Fantasy, 2005)
 Colquitt's High-energy Trousers (The Mammoth Book of New Comic Fantasy, 2005)
 The Two Funereal Urns of Mrs Tate (Whispers of Wickedness magazine, 2005)
 Mrs Mathews is Afraid of Cricket Bats (Dark Doorways, 2006)
 An Occasional Card (Tryst, 2006)
 Harry, the Wife, and Mrs Robson, Hell's Temptress from Number Six (Andromeda Spaceways Inflight Magazine 24, 2006)
 Mary's Gift, the Stars, and Frank's Pisser (Zencore, Nemonymous 7, 2007)
 Of Kate, and Love, and the Faraway Door (AfterburnSF, 2007)
 To Pull a Child from a Woman (Sein und Werden, 2007)
 Bob, and Clair, and the Meaning of Life (Ink Magazine, 2007)
 Lucy's Flower (The Horror Express 6, 2007)
 Night Dreaming (The Future Fire, 2008)
 The Love Ship Guide to Seduction in Zero Gravity (Murky Depths, 2008)
 Leonard Rom (Premonitions, 2008)
 The Book of Ruth (Black Static, 2008)
 The Love Ship Guide to Seduction in Zero Gravity (Galaxies, 2009)
 When Norman Dreamed (Sonar 4 Horror and Science Fiction Anthology, 2009)
 Ruth's Dying Breath in the Night (Necrotic Tissue, 2009)
 The Goodship Hyperdrive (Murky Depths, 2010)
 The Spring Heel (Haunted Legends, 2010)
 To Pull a Child from a Woman (Sideshow 2, 2010)
 Ruth Across the Sea (Shock Totem, 2011)
 This is Mary's Moon (Black Static, 2011)

References

External links
 Author's website

English horror writers
English fantasy writers
Living people
Year of birth missing (living people)